Henry Edmund Roberts (8 February 1888 – 28 June 1963) was an English first-class cricketer. Roberts was a fast bowler for Sussex, debuting in 1911. He ended his career 14 years later and in 1927 became coach of the Sandhurst Royal Military Academy.

References

External links 
 

1888 births
1963 deaths
English cricketers
Sussex cricketers
Place of birth missing
English cricket coaches